The Pascall Prize for Arts Criticism, formerly known as the Pascall Prize and then the Walkley-Pascall Award or Walkley-Pascall Award for Arts Criticism, is one of two annual Walkley Arts Journalism prizes awarded by the Walkley Foundation. The prize was established in 1988 in memory of Geraldine Pascall, an Australian journalist who died of a stroke at the age of 38.

The other award is the June Andrews Award for Arts Journalism, which is supported by the Copyright Agency, recognises significant contribution to arts journalism, and is open to short and long form journalism in all media. This was established in 2017 as the Arts Journalism Award.

History 
The Pascall Prize was conceived as a biennial literary award for creative writers who had made original and distinctive contributions to Australia's cultural life. In 1990, to better reflect the work and personal interests of the late Geraldine Pascall, it was decided that the Prize should be awarded annually to a critic or reviewer who contributed regularly in Australia to a newspaper, periodical, or on radio or television. This was extended to include the internet.

It was also agreed that the Pascall Prize would be awarded to a critic working in the areas of literature, art (including design and architecture), food and or wine, music, musical theatre, dance and or drama, film, television or radio. Only sport was specifically excluded.

From 1988 to 2014, the recipient of the Pascall Prize was selected by a judging panel of industry peers appointed by Directors of the Geraldine Pascall Foundation, a not-for-profit organisation established specifically to award the prize. The Pascall Prize and the Geraldine Pascall Foundation were managed by the Music & Opera Singers Trust.

In 2015, the inaugural Lifetime Achievement Award was presented to film critic, journalist and speechwriter Evan Willams  on 23 May 2015 at an event held at the Sydney Writers' Festival.

In May 2017, it was announced that the Walkley Foundation would take over administration of the Pascall Prize for Arts Criticism and rename it the Walkley-Pascall Award for Arts Criticism, or Walkley-Pascall Award for short. The first Walkley-Pascall Award was made to Kate Hennessy of The Guardian.

Also in 2017, the Arts Journalism Award was established, later named the June Andrews Award for Arts Journalism.

Description 
The Pascall Prize is an annual Australian award for critical writing and review, awarded to an art critic whose work over the previous 12 months has contributed significantly to the cultural landscape. , it was the only major national prize awarded for critical writing or reviewing in Australia. 

The Lifetime Achievement Award is presented to a critic whose body of work exemplifies the values of the Geraldine Pascall Foundation and the Pascall Prize. The inaugural award was presented in 2015.

The June Andrews Award for Arts Journalism is supported by the Copyright Agency, and recognises significant contribution to arts journalism, and is open to short and long form journalism in all media.

Recipients of the Lifetime Achievement Award

Recipients of the Pascall Prize for Arts Criticism

References

External links 

 Pascall Prize and Geraldine Pascall Foundation website (archived 2015)
 Pascall Prize YouTube channel

Australian literary awards
Australian journalism awards
Awards established in 1988